This is a list of mayors of Saginaw, Michigan.

City of East Saginaw 1859–1889
The City of East Saginaw was incorporated in 1859 and existed until it was consolidated with the City of Saginaw in 1889 (effective 1890). The City Charter was granted by the legislature. Mayors were elected for one-year terms.

City Charter of 1889
The City of East Saginaw and the City of Saginaw were consolidated by an act of the Legislature of the State of Michigan in 1889 and was given the same name as the former City of Saginaw. The city charter was granted by legislative act and provided for an elected executive mayor and a city council consisting of 21 aldermen elected from several wards in the city.

City Charter of 1913
The Legislature of the State of Michigan enacted the Home Rule Cities Act in 1909 that permitted cities to frame and adopt their own Charters. In 1913 the electors of the City of Saginaw adopted a Charter following the Commission form of government. It became effective January 1, 1914 at which time the mayor and commissioners took office.

City Charter of 1936
Under the current city charter, effective January 6, 1936, the mayoral term in Saginaw is two years. The mayor is chosen by the City Council from among its own members at the first meeting following a regular municipal election which takes place in November of odd-numbered years. The first city council under the current charter took office on January 6, 1936 and chose a mayor at that time to serve until after the 1937 municipal election. Elections were held in April from 1937 through 1971, at which time it was changed to November.

See also
Government of Saginaw, Michigan
Saginaw, Michigan

References

Saginaw